Constance Abernathy (born Constance Davies, June 20, 1931 – June 18, 1994) was an American architect, jeweler, and associate of Buckminster Fuller.

Architecture 
Abernathy worked on a special project studying with Buckminster Fuller to create the geodesic dome egg carton form of architecture, and functioned as Fuller's secretary maintaining sections of his files and archives. Between 1966 and 1971, she directed Fuller's New York office.

Jewelry 
Beginning in 1977, Abernathy became a jeweler. In New York City she befriended and worked with many famous artists. Among her artist friends were many well known painters and sculptors like Larry Rivers, Peter Reginato, Peter Young, Ching Ho Cheng, Ronnie Landfield, and Dan Christensen. Ching Ho Cheng painted her portrait in 1977.  In the 1980s her works started to include precious gems and cast parts she created. Her big bead necklaces were collected by Clarice Cosby and many others. Her works are in the collections of the Cooper Hewitt and Museum of Art and Design.

Other collaborations 
Abernathy appears on recordings by John Giorno from the late 1960s and on the live album The Sound Pool by Musica Elettronica Viva, recorded in May 1969.

Personal life 
She was born in Detroit, Michigan, Abernathy  attended Cass Technical High School and University of Michigan Architecture school (class of 1953).

She married J. T. Abernathy, a potter and art professor at University of Michigan in the 1950s but their union did not last long. She left Ann Arbor, Michigan for Paris shortly after, arriving in the swinging scene of the Paris 1960s. She worked as an architect all over Europe and married a filmmaker.

In the early 1990s she was diagnosed with cancer and she succumbed to her illness in 1994. Before she died she had a farewell party for her closest friends; and she distributed her worldly possessions among them as her way of saying goodbye. She died two days before her 63rd birthday at home in her Chelsea apartment in New York City soon after her party.

Archive
 Abernathy's papers are available at the Bentley Historical Library, University of Michigan

References

1931 births
1994 deaths
20th-century American architects
Artists from Detroit
Architects from Michigan
American women architects
University of Michigan alumni
20th-century American women artists